The Indian Network on Climate Change Assessment (INCCA) is a proposed network of scientists in India to be set up to publish peer-reviewed findings on climate change in India.

It was announced on 7 October 2009 , saying:

It was re-announced on 25 January 2012 by an official of the climate change division in the Environment Ministry after a strategy meeting chaired by Joint Secretary (Climate) J.M. Mausker, which also dealt with the framing of India's National Action Plan on Climate Change (NAPCC). On 4 February 2010 India's environment minister Jairam Ramesh announced that it would bring together 250 scientists from 125 Indian research institutions and collaborate with international organisations.its first assessment of greenhouse gas emission was released on May 11, 2010 and Its second climate assessment to be published in November 2010 would include reports on the Himalayas, the coastline of India, the Western Ghat highlands and the north-eastern region of India. He said it would operate as a “sort of Indian IPCC", but will not rival the UN’s Intergovernmental Panel on Climate Change (IPCC).

Ramesh also announced the initiation of an Indian National Institute of Himalayan Glaciology. He said that although he respected the IPCC, it was unequal to the task and its weakness was that it did not conduct its own research. Ramesh also indicated its biases made it insensitive to regional realities, and instead relied on compiling assessments of other reports, which, led to "goof-ups" on the Amazon forests, Himalayan glaciers, and ice caps.

References

Environment of India
Climate change organizations
2010 establishments in India
Organizations established in 2010
Proposed organizations